Angela Busson du Maurier (1 March 1904 – 5 February 2002) was an English actress and novelist who also wrote two volumes of autobiography, It's Only the Sister (1951) and Old Maids Remember (1965). Her sister was the novelist Daphne du Maurier, and her grandfather was George du Maurier, a writer and cartoonist.

Life

Angela du Maurier was born on 1 March 1904 in St Pancras, London, the eldest of three daughters of the actor-manager Sir Gerald du Maurier and his wife, actress Muriel Beaumont. Her paternal grandfather was the author and Punch cartoonist George du Maurier, who created the character of Svengali in the novel Trilby. Her paternal uncle Guy du Maurier was a playwright.

Her mother was a paternal niece of journalist, author, lecturer and editor Comyns Beaumont. Her middle sister (Daphne) became a popular writer, while her younger sister (Jeanne) was a painter. She was also a cousin of the Llewelyn Davies boys, who served as J. M. Barrie's inspiration for the characters in the play Peter Pan, or The Boy Who Wouldn't Grow Up.

As a young child, du Maurier met many prominent theatre actors, thanks to the celebrity of her father. Originally aspiring to follow the family tradition of acting, she planned to be an actress and spent two seasons on the stage. She played Wendy Darling alongside both Gladys Cooper and Dorothy Dickson as Peter Pan. 

After her father's death in 1934, du Maurier, together with her mother and her younger sister Jeanne, moved from Cannon Hall, the family home in Hampstead, to a smaller house nearby. The three of them also spent a lot of time at Ferryside, their home in Bodinnick, Cornwall, where they lived permanently after 1939. She worked on the land in Cornwall during the World War II, and travelled extensively in Europe.

She later turned to writing, with the release of her earlier works coinciding with the publication of her sister's Rebecca and Frenchman's Creek. She published 12 novels and 2 autobiographies.

She died at age 97 on 5 February 2002 in Wandsworth. Although she was the eldest of the sisters, she outlived her middle sister Daphne by thirteen years, and her youngest sister Jeanne by five years.

Bibliography
 1939	 The Perplexed Heart
 1940	 The Spinning Wheel
 1941	 The Little Less
 1942	 Treveryan
 1946	 Lawrence Vane
 1948	 Birkinshaw and other stories
 1950	 Reveille
 1951	 It's Only the Sister: an autobiography
 1952	 Shallow Waters
 1963	 The Road to Leenane
 1965	 Old Maids Remember: autobiography
 1967	 Pilgrims by the Way
 1967	 S is for Sin
 1969	 The Frailty of Nature

References

Further reading
Williams, Michael The Three du Maurier Sisters. Polperro Heritage Press 

1904 births
2002 deaths
People from St Pancras, London
English women novelists
20th-century English novelists
20th-century English women writers
Angela